The Island Packet 35 is an American sailboat that was designed by Robert K. Johnson as a cruiser and first built in 1988.

Production
The design was built by Island Packet Yachts in the United States, with 178 examples completed between 1988 and 1994. It is now out of production.

Design
The Island Packet 35 is a recreational keelboat, built predominantly of fiberglass, with teak wood trim. It has a cutter rig with anodized aluminum spars, a raked stem, a vertical transom, a keel-mounted rudder controlled by a wheel and a fixed long keel or optional long keel with a centerboard. It displaces  and carries  of ballast. The design features a platform-type bowsprit.

The galley is located on the starboard side and includes a three-burner gimballed liquid petroleum gas stove and oven, a double sink with pressurized hot and cold water and  icebox. The head is located forward, just aft of the "V"-berth in the bow. Additional sleeping accommodation is provided by an aft private cabin with a double berth, plus the main saloon settees which convert to a single berth on the starboard side and a double on the port, for a total sleeping space for seven people. A navigation station is located on the port side of the cabin. The interior trim is teak with a holly cabin sole.

Ventilation is provided by two opening ports and an overhead hatch in the aft cabin, a hatch and two opening ports in the bow cabin and a hatch and more opening ports in the main cabin.

The cockpit has pedestal-mounted wheel steering, a coldwater shower and a separate icebox.

The jib and boom-mounted staysail have furling systems, while the mainsail has a single-line reefing system. The mainsail is mid-boom sheeted to the cabin roof and has a mainsheet traveler. There are two mast-mounted halyard winches and two cockpit jib winches. The design features double backstays and an adjustable topping lift.

Operational history
In a review in 2000, yacht designer Robert Perry praised the style of the Island Packet 35 and wrote, "the Island Packet combines contemporary hull design with the forgiveness of a long keel to give the owner an easily handled yacht that takes care of itself with little helm assist. This is what a long keel boat should do."

A 2017 review in the Spinsheet said, "I would characterize this design as a conservative, traditional cruiser that is likely to appeal to sailors more interested in comfort than speed made good to weather. The design has quite high freeboard and a high cabin trunk, but these features are disguised by a beautifully drawn sweeping sheerline and bowsprit, which make the boat look longer and lower than it really is ... For coastal cruising and livability aboard a 35-footer, this model has a lot to offer, and the prices reflect Island Packet’s popularity and reputation for solid construction."

See also
List of sailing boat types

Similar sailboats
C&C 34/36
C&C 35
Cal 35
Cal 35 Cruise
Express 35
Freedom 35
Goderich 35
Hughes 36
Hughes-Columbia 36
Hunter 35 Legend
Hunter 35.5 Legend
Hunter 356
Landfall 35
Mirage 35
Niagara 35
Southern Cross 35

References

Keelboats
1980s sailboat type designs
Sailing yachts
Sailboat type designs by Robert K. Johnson
Sailboat types built by Island Packet Yachts